Ta Ku Ling is an area in the New Territories, Hong Kong, at the junction of Hiram's Highway and Clear Water Bay Road. Northeast of Razor Hill and south of a hill of same name, the area administratively belongs to Sai Kung District.

Ta Ku Ling Village and Ta Ku Ling New Village (Ta Ku Ling San Tsuen) are both located in this area.

References

External links
Map of the area from Centamap
Ta Ku Ling Ying Public School 

Populated places in Hong Kong
Places in Hong Kong
Sai Kung District